Jack Jacobs (1919–1974), was an American and Canadian football player.

Jack Jacobs may also refer to:

Jack Jacobs (cricketer) (1909–2003), New Zealand cricketer
Jack H. Jacobs (born 1945), Medal of Honor recipient
Jack B. Jacobs, Delaware judge

See also
John Jacobs (disambiguation)